Sir Arthur Conrad Reed (21 December 1881 – 15 January 1961) was a British Conservative Party politician.

Born in Bathford, Somerset, the son of William Henry Reed, he was educated at Queen's College, Taunton. He was elected at the 1931 general election as the Member of Parliament (MP) for Exeter, and held the seat until he retired from Parliament at the 1945 general election.

He was knighted in 1945.

References

External links 
 

1881 births
1961 deaths
People educated at Queen's College, Taunton
Conservative Party (UK) MPs for English constituencies
UK MPs 1931–1935
UK MPs 1935–1945
Knights Bachelor
Place of birth missing
Members of the Parliament of the United Kingdom for Exeter